Regina Petrivna Todorenko ( also Regina Petrovna Todorenko in ; born 14 June 1990), is a Ukrainian pop-singer and television presenter.

Biography 
Regina Todorenko was born 14 June 1990 in Odessa. As a child she spent a lot of time in the theatre studio, dance class, and took vocal lessons. She finished school with honors in 2007. In the same year Regina enrolled in the Odessa National Maritime University, the faculty of "Organization of transport and transport systems". In 2010 she entered the Kyiv National University of Culture and Arts, receiving a Master's Degree in Theatre Arts.

From 2014 to 2021 she was the host of the program "Oryol i Reshka".

In 2015 Regina Todorenko recorded her debut song and shot a video for the song "Heart's Beating". In the same year she became a member of the Russian show "Voice". At the blind audition Regina performed the song Tina Karol "the Night". Her tutor was Polina Gagarina.

Domestic abuse controversy 

On April 23, 2020, Todorenko was interviewed by Laura Dzhugelia of PeopleTalk, a celebrity news outlet. During the interview, she made comments about domestic abuse, including asking, “What did you do to make him hit you?"  Days later, Russian Glamour magazine stripped her of her "Woman of the Year" title. 

Todorenko apologised for the comments, saying she was opposed to all domestic violence and had used an incorrect formulation.

Discography

Singles 
 2015 — Биение сердца (Heart's Beating)
 2015 — Ты мне нужен (I Need You)
 2016 — Мама (Mum)

Music videos

Covers

Singles

Actress

References

External links 
 Official Site
 

1990 births
Living people
Musicians from Odesa
Ukrainian pop singers
English-language singers from Ukraine
21st-century Ukrainian  women singers
Ukrainian women television presenters